Julián Pérez Huarancca (born 1954, Ayacucho) is a Peruvian novelist.

Education 
He attended La Cantuta University in Lima from 1991 to 1994, earning a B.A. in literature and language.

Career 
Then he worked as a professor at the San Cristóbal of Huamanga University in his hometown of Ayacucho. After receiving a Ph.D.  in Peruvian and Latin American literature from the National University of San Marcos, he began to work at Federico Villarreal National University in 1998. Julián Pérez is notable for themes of the Andes, writing about Ayacucho, and for his stark depictions of violence and introspective narratives.

Family 
He is the brother of the writer Hildebrando Pérez Huarancca.
His daughter is Paola Perez

Novels

Transeúntes (1988)
Tikanka (1989)
Fuego y ocaso (1998)
Papel de viento (2000)
Retablo (2004)
El fantasma que te Desgarra (2008)
Piel de utopía y otros cuentos (2011)
 Resto que no cesa de insistir (2011)
Criba (2013)
Anamorfosis (2017)

Awards
 "Julian Ramón Ribeyro" Short Novel Competition (2017) for Anamórfosis
Federico Villarreal National Award (2003) for Retablo
 (2013) for Criba

References

External links
  Julián Pérez Huarancca (Ayacucho, 1954)

1954 births
20th-century Peruvian writers
21st-century Peruvian writers
Date of birth missing (living people)
Living people
Mestizo writers
National University of San Marcos alumni
People from Ayacucho
Peruvian male writers
Peruvian novelists
Peruvian male short story writers
20th-century short story writers
21st-century short story writers
20th-century male writers
21st-century male writers